Amor a primera vista (English language: Love at first Sight) is a 1956  Argentine musical comedy directed by Leo Fleider and written by Abel Santacruz and Jean Cartier. It is a tango film, based on an integral part of Argentine culture.

Cast
Lolita Torres....Matilde Alvarezza / Carlitos
Osvaldo Miranda....Mario de la Rosa
Ramón Garay....Valentín Saporiti
Susana Campos....Lucía
Morenita Galé....Manón
Josefa Goldar....mrs. Clara
Nelly Lainez....Rosario
Mónica Linare....Mecha
Lalo Malcolm....mr. César
Marcos Zucker....Jaime

External links

1956 films
1956 musical comedy films
Argentine musical comedy films
1950s Spanish-language films
Tango films
1950s Argentine films
Films directed by Leo Fleider
Argentine black-and-white films